UniversalGiving is an online nonprofit organization based in San Francisco. The organization focuses on raising money for international charities through its web based marketplace, and on matching volunteers with global opportunities.  Visitors of their website can search by country or cause, and are given a list of opportunities to give or volunteer.

UniversalGiving uses a venture capital approach to vetting charities that appear on their site, vetting all opportunities. They do not take any share on donations made through their site.

UniversalGiving was founded in 2002 by Pamela Hawley, one of the co-founders of VolunteerMatch.

In 2009, UniversalGiving received a Jefferson Award for Public Service, and in 2010 was a Finalist for Ernst and Young's Entrepreneur of the Year Award.  2010 also saw the launch of two partnerships in Community Based Journalism, with Link TV and the Christian Science Monitor.

References

External links 

 Official Website

Charities based in California